Puerto Ricans in Chicago are people living in Chicago who have ancestral connections to the island of Puerto Rico. They have contributed to the economic, social and cultural well-being of Chicago for more than seventy years.

History 

The Puerto Rican community in Chicago has a history that stretches back more than 70 years. The first migration to Chicago, in the 1930s, was not from the island of Puerto Rico itself but from New York City. Many settled on State Street just south of the downtown hotels. There only a small number of people joined this migration. 

The first large wave of migration to Chicago came in the late 1940s, when many settled in the La Clark neighborhood around Dearborn, La Salle and Clark Streets just north of downtown Chicago. Starting in 1946, many people were recruited by Castle Barton Associates and other companies as low-wage, non-union foundry workers and domestic workers in hotels and private homes. As soon as they were established in Chicago, many were joined by their spouses and families. The Puerto Rican neighborhoods of Wicker Park and Lincoln were one large neighborhood that became divided when the Kennedy Expressway was built in the late 1950s.

By the 1960s, Chicago's Puerto Rican community was displaced by urban redevelopment; they moved north and west to Old Town, Lincoln Park, Lakeview, and Wicker Park, later centering in West Town and Humboldt Park on the city's West Side. They first moved into nearby Lincoln Park just over the Chicago River. Puerto Rican settlement also occurred in Lawndale, also on the city's West Side. 

City hall-sponsored gentrification in Lincoln Park began in the early 1960s and was protested by a Lincoln Park Poor People's Coalition led by the Young Lords under the leadership of Jose Cha Cha Jimenez. The Puerto Rican community then moved north and west. 

The events of June 12 through 14, 1966, the Division Street riots, constituted the first major Puerto Rican urban rebellion in Chicago. The uprising took place about the time that the Chicago Police Department began taking "precautionary measures" to head off potential unrest of the type that had already occurred in African American centers such as Harlem, Watts and North Philadelphia.

In 1977, the Puerto Rican community came into conflict with the Chicago Police Department again at the Humboldt Park riot.

Present 

The Puerto Rican community is well established and politically active. With the support of the community, Puerto Rican leaders in Chicago leased the historic Humboldt Park stables near Paseo Boricua to house the Institute of Puerto Rican Arts and Culture. About $3.4 million was spent to renovate the exterior of the building and another $3.2 million for the interior in 2006. The Puerto Rican Arts Alliance is similarly enjoying growth, with expansion to its second location in Avondale in a former firehouse at the intersection of Central Park and Elbridge Avenues.

According to the 2010 census, those of full or partial Puerto Rican descent totaled 102,703, or 3.8% of Chicago's population, which is a decrease from 113,055 in 2000. The size of the community has continued to decline, with the 2019 American Community Survey listing the community at 97,758, or 3.63% of Chicago's population. 53% of Puerto Ricans in Illinois now live outside of Chicago (109,351 out of a total state population of 207,109). 

The decline is due to several factors, including economic opportunity, competition with new immigrants, high crime rates, the high cost of living, gentrification, cold weather, and intermarriage (stateside Puerto Ricans have a 38.5% intermarriage rate), with most moving to other states, such as Florida, Wisconsin, Ohio, Pennsylvania, and Georgia, the city's suburbs, or returning to Puerto Rico. Puerto Ricans are the city's second largest Hispanic group, after Mexicans (21% of the city's population in 2019). 

Most of Chicago's remaining Puerto Rican community is found on the northwest side of the city. The largest numbers of Puerto Ricans live in the Chicago community areas of Humboldt Park, Logan Square, Hermosa, Avondale, Austin, Belmont Cragin, Portage Park, and West Town, with Humboldt Park being their cultural and commercial center. As of the 2010 Census, areas immediately west and north of the actual Humboldt Park (Chicago park) have the largest numbers of Puerto Ricans in Chicago. Significant Puerto Rican populations also live in Chicago's suburbs, including Waukegan, Aurora, Cicero, and Elgin.

Paseo Boricua 

Paseo Boricua (loosely translated as "Boricua (Puerto Rican) Promenade") is a street section on the West Side of Chicago. It is located on Division Street, between Western Avenue and California Avenue, in the East Humboldt Park section of the West Town neighborhood. Paseo Boricua is a microcosm of the Puerto Rican community. It is the only officially recognized Puerto Rican neighborhood in the nation. New York City, with its vast Puerto Rican population, does not have an officially designated Puerto Rican neighborhood.

Flanking this strip on both sides are these fifty-nine-feet-tall Puerto Rican flags made of steel, two gateways that are the bookends of Paseo Boricua.

Many businesses are named after Puerto Rican towns.

This street is dedicated to Puerto Rican pride, including a walk of fame with the names of many outstanding Puerto Ricans.

The Humboldt Park Paseo Boricua neighborhood is the flagship of all Puerto Rican enclaves. This neighborhood is the political and cultural capital of the Puerto Rican community in the Midwest.

Over time, Paseo Boricua became a place where Puerto Ricans could go to learn about their heritage. A culture center was established, and local Puerto Rican politicians relocated their offices to Division Street. Recently, the City of Chicago has set aside money for Paseo Boricua property owners who want to restore their buildings' facades.

Visitors can hear salsa, reggaeton, bomba, plena, and merengue music pulsating through the streets and smell the mouth-watering carne guisada puertorriqueña. A couple of grocers have set up shop to help buyers find those hard-to-acquire products from home, such as gandules verde, sazón, and naranja agria.

The area is visually stunning, having many colorful and historically important murals as well as two affordable-housing buildings with facades and colors mimicking the Spanish colonial styles of Old San Juan. A tile mosaic of Puerto Rican baseball slugger Roberto Clemente greets visitors at one end of the street, near the high school that bears his name.

Several times a year, Paseo Boricua is decorated to celebrate important Puerto Rican holidays, such as Three Kings Day, the Puerto Rican People's Parade, Haunted Paseo Boricua, and Fiesta Boricua, with an estimated 650,000 attendees.

Puerto Rican Parade 

The Puerto Rican Parade Committee of Chicago has been serving its community for over 40 years. Now in its 48th year, the six-day festival in Humboldt Park has become the largest attended Latino festival in the city of Chicago and in the Midwest.

Education

Gina M. Pérez, the author of The Near Northwest Side Story: Migration, Displacement, and Puerto Rican Families, wrote that in Chicago Roberto Clemente Community Academy is known as "the Puerto Rican high school." Jennifer Domino Rudolph, author of Embodying Latino Masculinities: Producing Masculatinidad, wrote that the school "is strongly associated with Puerto Rican cultural nationalism." 

Ana Y. Ramos-Zayas, author of National Performances: The Politics of Class, Race, and Space in Puerto Rican Chicago, wrote that the school was portrayed in the media as "the property of Puerto Rican nationalists" and "as part of Puerto Rico."

See also 

Puerto Ricans in the United States
Puerto Rican people
Demographics of Chicago
Paseo Boricua
Young Lords
Latin Kings
A Latino Resource
Division Street riots
Humboldt Park riot

Gallery

References 
Pérez, Gina M. The Near Northwest Side Story: Migration, Displacement, and Puerto Rican Families. University of California Press, October 4, 2004. , 9780520936416.
Ramos-Zayas, Ana Y. National Performances: The Politics of Class, Race, and Space in Puerto Rican Chicago. University of Chicago Press, July 15, 2003. , 9780226703596.

Notes

Further reading
 Betancur, John J. "The settlement experience of Latinos in Chicago: Segregation, speculation, and the ecology model." Social Forces 74.4 (1996): 1299-1324.
 Burwell, Rebecca, et al. "The Chicago Latino Congregations Study (CLCS): Methodological Considerations" (University of Notre Dame, Institute for Latino Studies, Center for the Study of Latino Religion, 2010).

 Cruz, Wilfredo. Puerto Rican Chicago (Images of America). Arcadia Publishing, February 2, 2005. , 9781439631546.
 Farr, Marcia. Latino language and literacy in ethnolinguistic Chicago (Routledge, 2005).
 Fernández, Lilia. Brown in the Windy City: Mexicans and Puerto Ricans in Postwar Chicago (2012). excerpt
 Mumm, Jesse Stewart. "When the white people come: Gentrification and race in Puerto Rican Chicago" (PhD diss.  Northwestern University, 2014).
 Padilla, Felix M. Latino ethnic consciousness: the case of Mexican Americans and Puerto Ricans in Chicago (University of Notre Dame Press, 1985).

 Pallares, Amalia, and Nilda Flores-González, eds. ¡ Marcha!: Latino Chicago and the immigrant rights movement (University of Illinois Press, 2010).
 Paral, Rob, et al. "Latino demographic growth in metropolitan Chicago." (University of Notre Dame, Institute for Latino Studies, Center for the Study of Latino Religion, 2004) online.
 Rinaldo, Rachel. "Space of resistance: the Puerto Rican cultural center and Humboldt Park" Cultural Critique 50 (2002): 135-174. 
 
 Roberts, Emma González. Understanding Paseo Boricua: why the preservation of Chicago's Puerto Rican enclave matters (Thesis Massachusetts Institute of Technology, 2021). online

 Rúa, Mérida M. A grounded identidad: Making new lives in Chicago's Puerto Rican neighborhoods (Oxford University Press, 2012) excerpt 

 Toro-Morn, Maura, Ivis García Zambrana, and Marixsa Alicea. "De bandera a bandera (from flag to flag): New scholarship about the Puerto Rican diaspora in Chicago." Centro Journal 28.2 (2016): 4+.

External links
 Young Lords in Lincoln Park
National Young Lords

Hispanic and Latino American culture in Chicago
 
Ethnic groups in Chicago